Upper Egypt (shortened to , ,) is the southern portion of Egypt and is composed of the Nile River valley south of the delta and the 30th parallel N. It thus consists of the entire Nile River valley from Cairo south to Lake Nasser (formed by the Aswan High Dam). 

In ancient Egypt, Upper Egypt was known as tꜣ šmꜣw, literally "the Land of Reeds" or "the Sedgeland". 
It is believed to have been united by the rulers of the supposed Thinite Confederacy who absorbed their rival city states during the Naqada III period (c. 3200–3000 BC), and its subsequent unification with Lower Egypt ushered in the Early Dynastic period. Upper and Lower Egypt became intertwined in the symbolism of pharaonic sovereignty such as the Pschent double crown. Upper Egypt remained as a historical region even after the classical period.

Geography
Upper Egypt is between the Cataracts of the Nile beyond modern-day Aswan, downriver (northward) to the area of El-Ayait, which places modern-day Cairo in Lower Egypt. The northern (downriver) part of Upper Egypt, between Sohag and El-Ayait, is also known as Middle Egypt.

In Arabic, inhabitants of Upper Egypt are known as Sa'idis and they generally speak Sai'idi Egyptian Arabic.

History

Predynastic Egypt
The main city of prehistoric Upper Egypt was Nekhen. The patron deity was the goddess Nekhbet, depicted as a vulture.

By approximately 3600 BC, Neolithic Egyptian societies along the Nile based their culture on the raising of crops and the domestication of animals. Shortly thereafter, Egypt began to grow and increase in complexity. A new and distinctive pottery appeared, related to the Levantine ceramics, and copper implements and ornaments became common. Mesopotamian building techniques became popular, using sun-dried adobe bricks in arches and decorative recessed walls. 

In Upper Egypt, the predynastic Badari culture was followed by the Naqada culture (Amratian), closely related to the Nubian and other tropical African populations,  and the Proto-dynastic kings emerged from the Naqada region. Excavations at Hierakonpolis (Upper Egypt) found archaeological evidence of ritual masks similar to those used further south of Egypt, and obsidian linked to Ethiopian quarry sites.

According to bioarchaeologist Nancy Lovell, the morphology of ancient Egyptian skeletons gives strong evidence that "In general, the inhabitants of Upper Egypt and Nubia had the greatest biological affinity to people of the Sahara and more 
southerly areas" but exhibited local variation in an African context. 

S.O.Y. Keita, a biological anthropologist also reviewed studies on the biological affinities of the Ancient Egyptian population and characterised the skeletal morphologies of predynastic southern Egyptians as a "Saharo-tropical African variant". Keita had also added that whilst Egyptian society became more socially complex and biologically varied, the “ethnicity of the Niloto-Saharo-Sudanese origins did not change”.

These cultural advances paralleled the political unification of towns of the upper Nile River, or Upper Egypt, while the same occurred in the societies of the Nile Delta, or Lower Egypt. This led to warfare between the two new kingdoms. During his reign in Upper Egypt, King Narmer defeated his enemies on the delta and became sole ruler of the two lands of Upper and Lower Egypt, a sovereignty which endured throughout Dynastic Egypt.

Dynastic Egypt
In royal symbolism, Upper Egypt was represented by the tall White Crown Hedjet, the flowering lotus, and the sedge. Its patron deity, Nekhbet, was depicted by the vulture. After unification, the patron deities of Upper and Lower Egypt were represented together as the Two Ladies, to protect all of the ancient Egyptians, just as the two crowns were combined into a single pharaonic diadem.   

Several dynasties of southern or Upper Egyptian origin, which included the 11th, 12th, 17th, 18th and 25th dynasties, reunified and reinvigorated pharaonic Egypt after periods of fragmentation.

For most of Egypt's ancient history, Thebes was the administrative center of Upper Egypt. After its devastation by the Assyrians, the importance of Egypt declined. Under the dynasty of the Ptolemies, Ptolemais Hermiou took over the role of the capital city of Upper Egypt.

Medieval Egypt
In the eleventh century, large numbers of pastoralists, known as Hilalians, fled Upper Egypt and moved westward into Libya and as far as Tunis. It is believed that degraded grazing conditions in Upper Egypt, associated with the beginning of the Medieval Warm Period, were the root cause of the migration.

20th-century Egypt
In the twentieth-century Egypt, the title Prince of the Sa'id (meaning Prince of Upper Egypt) was used by the heir apparent to the Egyptian throne.

Although the Kingdom of Egypt was abolished after the Egyptian revolution of 1952, the title continues to be used by Muhammad Ali, Prince of the Sa'id.

List of rulers of prehistoric Upper Egypt

The following list may not be complete (there are many more of uncertain existence):

List of nomes

See also
 Sa'idi people
 Nubian people
 Beja people
 Upper and Lower Egypt
 Geography of Egypt

Explanatory notes

References

Citations

General bibliography

Further reading
 Edel, Elmar (1961) Zu den Inschriften auf den Jahreszeitenreliefs der "Weltkammer" aus dem Sonnenheiligtum des Niuserre Vandenhoeck & Ruprecht, Göttingen, in German.

External links
 

 
States and territories established in the 4th millennium BC
States and territories disestablished in the 4th millennium BC

Upper
Historical regions